Shahrak-e Paqalat (also Romanized as Shahrak-e Pāqalāt) is a village in Babuyi Rural District, Basht District, Basht County, Kohgiluyeh and Boyer-Ahmad Province, Iran. At the 2006 census, its population was 77, in 19 families.

References 

Populated places in Basht County